Zhangye railway station is located 6.4 km north east of Zhangye, Gansu. It handles about 49 passenger services per day along the Lanzhou–Xinjiang Railway as well as being a major freight depot.

The platforms are all low level servicing 3 tracks, one alongside the station building and two more along an island platform reached via a footbridge.

References

Stations on the Lanzhou-Xinjiang Railway
Railway stations in Gansu